Saint-Épiphane is a municipality in Quebec in the administrative region of Bas-Saint-Laurent and the regional county municipality of Rivière-du-Loup.

See also
 List of municipalities in Quebec

References

Municipalities in Quebec
Incorporated places in Bas-Saint-Laurent
Canada geography articles needing translation from French Wikipedia